Johannes Schöning is a computer scientist best known for his research in human-computer interaction, geoinformatics and mobile computing and was awarded with the ACM Eugene L. Lawler Award for humanitarian contributions within Computer Science and Informatics in 2012. He is a professor at the University of Bremen in Germany. He owns a "Lichtenberg-Professur" of the Volkswagen Foundation.

References 

Year of birth missing (living people)
Living people
German computer scientists